The Lisnagarvey transmitting station is a facility for mediumwave broadcasting located in the townland of Magherageery, on the southern edge of Lisburn, Northern Ireland. It is close to Sprucefield shopping centre and about one mile from the middle of Lisburn.

The station was built by the BBC for the Regional Programme to be transmitted to Northern Ireland and it went into service in 1936. It is now owned by Arqiva.

During World War II, a 100 kW shortwave transmitter (Marconi model SWB18) was installed at the station as an alternative to the well-known one at Daventry in England, in case that one should suffer from an enemy attack.  It transmitted on 6140 or 6145 kHz, and used the call sign GRW.  The shortwave transmitter was taken out of service on 26 May 1946 and was later redeployed at the BBC Far Eastern Relay station at Tebrau, Malaya in January 1951.

The station includes three radio masts, including two standard lattice masts and one Blaw-Knox diamond cantilever vertical radiator. The two standard lattice masts have a wire slung T-antenna suspended between them. The Blaw-Knox radiator is the only one of its kind in Western Europe. The height of a vertical radiator is related to the frequency (or wavelength) of the service transmitted, and for maximum efficiency should be one half of the station's wavelength. Its height was originally , but it was shortened when the station's broadcast frequency was changed.

Similar masts in Europe can be found nowadays only at Lakihegy, Hungary, at Riga, Latvia, and at Vakarel, Bulgaria.

BBC Radio Ulster's service from the transmitter on 1341 kHz ended on Thursday 6 May 2021 at 0930 UTC, as part of the BBC's programme of switching off their medium wave services around the UK.


Transmitted services

Analogue radio (AM medium wave)

See also
List of masts
List of towers
List of radio stations in the United Kingdom

References

External links
Entry for Lisnagarvey transmitting station at The Transmission Gallery
BBCEng.info: Comprehensive article on the design and history of the tower
 
Entry at Skyscraperpage.com

Transmitter sites in Northern Ireland
Towers completed in 1936
1936 establishments in Northern Ireland